Scuderia Ambrosiana was an Italian motor racing team that competed in Grand Prix motor racing and the Formula One World Championship. The team was founded in 1937 by drivers Giovanni Lurani, Luigi Villoresi, Franco Cortese and Eugenio Minetti and was named after the patron saint of Milan, Saint Ambrose. The team's cars were painted in blue and black after the colours of F.C. Internazionale Milano, which at the time went under the name Ambrosiana Inter.

The team competed at the Targa Florio in 1937, 1938 and 1939, where it finished second, third, and second again with Lurani, Cortese and Villoresi. Cortese took also part at the German Grand Prix in 1938, where he finished ninth. In 1947 future World Champion Alberto Ascari drove for the team. Other drivers associated with Scuderia Ambrosiana include Tazio Nuvolari, Reg Parnell, Leslie Brooke and Clemar Bucci.

Between  and  Scuderia Ambrosiana competed sporadically in the Formula One world championship. Their best result was ninth place in the their first event, the 1950 British Grand Prix, with David Hampshire in a Maserati 4CL. The team's last entry was at the 1954 British Grand Prix, Reg Parnell retiring his Ferrari 500.

In 1951 Lurani and Giovanni Bracco took part in the 24 Hours of Le Mans with a Lancia Aurelia B20, finishing twelfth.

Formula One results

(key) (results in bold indicate pole position) (results in italics indicate fastest lap)

References

Formula One entrants
Italian auto racing teams
Companies established in 1937

24 Hours of Le Mans teams